Amalia Riégo (26 March 1850 – 27 December 1926) was a Swedish soprano opera singer.

Riégo was born in Karlskrona, the daughter of the Spanish circus director and tightrope dancer John Riégo and the sister of the actor John Isak Riégo. She was a student of Jenny Lind and Isak Albert Berg and debuted at the Royal Swedish Opera in 1872, where she was active for many years. She immigrated to the US in 1890. She died in  Nice at the age of 76.

References 
 Svenskt Porträttgalleri "XXI. Tonkonstnärer och sceniska artister" 'Amalia Riégo' 
 Svenskt biografiskt handlexikon II:346 'Riégo, John Isak' 

1850 births
1926 deaths
People from Karlskrona Municipality
Swedish operatic sopranos
Swedish people of Spanish descent
Swedish emigrants to the United States
19th-century Swedish women opera singers